"I Ain't Got Time Anymore" is a song by the British singer Cliff Richard, released as a single in August 1970. It peaked at number 21 on the UK Singles Chart.

Release
"I Ain't Got Time Anymore" was written by Mike Leander and Eddie Seago and features an accompaniment by the Mike Vickers Orchestra. It was released with the B-side "Monday Comes Too Soon", written by Hank Marvin and Jerry Lordan.

Reviewing for Record Mirror, Peter Jones described "I Ain't Got Time Anymore" as " a slow starter, through the verse with an inquiring sort of tone and then into a gentle-paced chorus, with voices tacked on... The performance is beyond criticism, as it usually is with Cliff. I guess his success is an ability to switch disc styles. Whatever it is this is destined for a very high chart placing".

Track listing
7": Columbia / DB 8708
 "I Ain't Got Time Anymore" – 2:32
 "Monday Comes Too Soon" – 2:30

Charts

The Glass Bottle version

In July 1971, American band The Glass Bottle released a cover of the song as a single. It peaked at number 36 on the Billboard Hot 100.

"I Ain't Got Time Anymore" was originally released as the B-side to a cover of the Bobby Darin song "Things". However, it was quickly released as the A-side with a different B-side, "The First Time".

Charts

References

Cliff Richard songs
1970 singles
1970 songs
1971 singles
Songs written by Mike Leander
Songs written by Eddie Seago
Columbia Graphophone Company singles
Avco Records singles
Song recordings produced by Norrie Paramor